Franklin Grove Township (formerly China Township) is one of twenty-two townships in Lee County, Illinois, USA.  As of the 2000 census, its population was 1,472.  Its name was changed from China Township in 1994.

Geography

Cities, towns, villages
 Franklin Grove

Cemeteries
The township contains these two cemeteries: Franklin Grove and Temperance Hill.

Demographics

School districts
 Amboy Community Unit School District 272
 Ashton Community Unit School District 275

Political districts
 Illinois's 14th congressional district
 State House District 90
 State Senate District 45

References
 
 United States Census Bureau 2009 TIGER/Line Shapefiles
 United States National Atlas

External links
 City-Data.com
 Illinois State Archives
 Township Officials of Illinois

Townships in Lee County, Illinois
1850 establishments in Illinois
Townships in Illinois